Antonio Modesto Quirasco (May 20, 1904 – July 3, 1981) was a Mexican politician. He was governor of Vera Cruz State.

1904 births
Governors of Veracruz
Institutional Revolutionary Party politicians
1981 deaths
Politicians from Veracruz